The 2009 Saxony state election was held on 30 August 2009 to elect the members of the 5th Landtag of Saxony. The incumbent grand coalition of the Christian Democratic Union (CDU) and Social Democratic Party (SPD) led by Minister-President Stanislaw Tillich retained its majority. However, the CDU chose to discontinue the coalition in favour of forming government with the Free Democratic Party (FDP). Tillich was subsequently re-elected as Minister-President.

Parties
The table below lists parties represented in the 4th Landtag of Saxony.

Opinion polling

Election result

|-
|colspan=8 align=center| 
|-
! colspan="2" | Party
! Votes
! %
! +/-
! Seats 
! +/-
! Seats %
|-
| bgcolor=| 
| align=left | Christian Democratic Union (CDU)
| align=right| 722,983
| align=right| 40.2
| align=right| 0.9
| align=right| 58
| align=right| 3
| align=right| 43.9
|-
| bgcolor=| 
| align=left | The Left (Linke)
| align=right| 370,359
| align=right| 20.6
| align=right| 3.0
| align=right| 29
| align=right| 2
| align=right| 22.0
|-
| bgcolor=| 
| align=left | Social Democratic Party (SPD)
| align=right| 187,261
| align=right| 10.4
| align=right| 0.6
| align=right| 14
| align=right| 1
| align=right| 10.6
|-
| bgcolor=| 
| align=left | Free Democratic Party (FDP)
| align=right| 178,867
| align=right| 10.0
| align=right| 4.1
| align=right| 14
| align=right| 7
| align=right| 10.6
|-
| bgcolor=| 
| align=left | Alliance 90/The Greens (Grüne)
| align=right| 114,963
| align=right| 6.4
| align=right| 1.3
| align=right| 9
| align=right| 3
| align=right| 6.8
|-
| bgcolor=| 
| align=left | National Democratic Party (NPD)
| align=right| 100,834
| align=right| 5.6
| align=right| 3.6
| align=right| 8
| align=right| 4
| align=right| 6.1
|-
! colspan=8|
|-
| bgcolor=| 
| align=left | Human Environment Animal Protection (Tierschutz)
| align=right| 36,932
| align=right| 2.1
| align=right| 0.5
| align=right| 0
| align=right| ±0
| align=right| 0
|-
| bgcolor=| 
| align=left | Pirate Party Germany (Piraten)
| align=right| 34,651
| align=right| 1.9
| align=right| New
| align=right| 0
| align=right| New
| align=right| 0
|-
|
| align=left | Free Saxony
| align=right| 24,287
| align=right| 1.4
| align=right| 1.4
| align=right| 0
| align=right| ±0
| align=right| 0
|-
| bgcolor=|
| align=left | Others
| align=right| 26,212
| align=right| 1.5
| align=right| 
| align=right| 0
| align=right| ±0
| align=right| 0
|-
! align=right colspan=2| Total
! align=right| 1,797,349
! align=right| 100.0
! align=right| 
! align=right| 132
! align=right| 8
! align=right| 
|-
! align=right colspan=2| Voter turnout
! align=right| 
! align=right| 52.2
! align=right| 7.4
! align=right| 
! align=right| 
! align=right| 
|}

Notes

References

Elections, 2009
2009 elections in Germany